The Committee of Ministers of the Council of Europe (French: Comité des ministres du Conseil de l'Europe) or Committee of Ministers (French: Comité des ministres) is the Council of Europe's decision-making body. It comprises the Foreign Affairs Ministers of all the member states, or their permanent diplomatic representatives in Strasbourg. It is both a governmental body, where national approaches to problems facing European society can be discussed on an equal footing, as well as a collective forum, where Europe-wide responses to such challenges are formulated. In collaboration with the Parliamentary Assembly, it is the guardian of the Council's fundamental values; it monitors member states' compliance with their undertakings. The Holy See, Japan, Mexico, and the US are observer states in the Committee of Ministers.

Members of the Committee of Ministers
The Minister of Foreign Affairs of each Council of Europe member state sits on the Committee of Ministers. In May 1951 the Committee of Ministers invited each member state to appoint a Permanent Representative who would be in constant touch with the organisation. All Permanent Representatives reside in Strasbourg. They are usually senior diplomats with ambassadorial rank, occasionally chargés d'affaires.

In 1952 the Committee of Ministers decided that each Minister could appoint a Deputy. The Ministers' Deputies have the same decision-making powers as the Ministers. A Deputy is usually also the Permanent Representative of the member state.

The second in rank in a delegation usually has the title "Deputy Permanent Representative", not to be confused with "Ministers' Deputy".

Current Chair of the Committee is highlighted, with the position being currently held by Þórdís Kolbrún R. Gylfadóttir from Iceland from November 2022 until May 2022.

On 25th February, following the Russian invasion of Ukraine, Russia’s rights of representation were suspended, but it remained a member of the Council of Europe and party to the relevant Council of Europe conventions, including the European Convention on Human Rights.

Meetings of the Committee of Ministers
The Committee meets at ministerial level once a year, in May or in November. The meetings, known as "sessions", are normally held in Strasbourg and usually last one full day or two half days. While the greater part of each session is usually devoted to political dialogue, the Ministers may discuss all matters of mutual interest with the exception of national defence. Although the records of the sessions are confidential, a final communiqué is issued at the end of each meeting. The Ministers may also issue one or more declarations.

"Meetings of the Ministers' Deputies" are usually held in the Committee of Ministers' meeting room once a week. The Deputies also meet several times a week in subsidiary groups.

The role of the Committee of Ministers
The Committee of Ministers performs a triple role; as the emanation of the governments which enables them to express on equal terms their national approaches to the problems confronting Europe's societies; as the collective forum where European responses to these challenges are worked out, alongside the Parliamentary Assembly of the Council of Europe and as guardian of the values for which the Council of Europe exists.

The work and activities of the Committee of Ministers include political dialogue, developing public international law through Council of Europe conventions, interacting with the Parliamentary Assembly of the Council of Europe, interacting with the Congress of Local and Regional Authorities of the Council of Europe.

Admitting new member States
The Committee of Ministers has the authority to invite European States to become members of the Council of Europe (Articles 4, 5 and 6 of the Statute). It may also suspend or terminate membership.

The process of admission begins when the Committee of Ministers, having received an official application for membership, consults the Parliamentary Assembly of the Council of Europe (under Statutory Resolution (51) 30). The Assembly adopts an opinion which is published in the Assembly's texts adopted.

If the Committee decides that a state can be admitted, it adopts a resolution inviting that state to become a member. The invitation specifies the number of seats that the state will have in the Assembly as well as its contribution to the budget. Recently the invitations have included a number of conditions concerning the implementation of democratic reforms in the applicant state.

Once invited, a state becomes a member by depositing, normally by the Minister for Foreign Affairs, an instrument of accession with the Secretary General of the Council of Europe.

The only European states which are not members of the Council of Europe and thus could in principle be admitted are Belarus, Kazakhstan and the Vatican as well as Kosovo pending clarification of its international legal status. Once the European Union has attained full legal personality, it could also accede to the Council of Europe. So far, the European Community has only signed Council of Europe treaties.

Monitoring respect of commitments by member states

Concluding Conventions and agreements
Article 15.a of the Statute states that the Committee of Ministers of the Council of Europe "shall consider the action required to further the aim of the Council of Europe, including the conclusion of conventions and agreements".

Over 190 treaties have now been opened for signature. The European Convention of Human Rights of 1950 is one of the best known Council of Europe treaties and the one with the strongest supervision mechanism by the European Court of Human Rights in Strasbourg and the Committee of Ministers.

The text of any treaty is finalised when it is adopted by the Committee. Under Article 20 of the Statute adoption of a treaty requires:

 a two-thirds majority of the representatives casting a vote;
 a majority of those entitled to vote.

The same majorities are required to authorise the publication of any explanatory report. The Committee also fixes the date that the treaty will be opened for signature. Conventions are legally binding for those States which ratify them.

Adopting recommendations to member states
Article 15.b of the Statute provides for the Committee of Ministers to make recommendations to member states on matters for which the Committee has agreed "a common policy".

Under Article 20 of the Statute, adoption of a recommendation requires a unanimous vote of all representatives present and a majority of those entitled to vote.

However, at their 519 bis meeting (November 1994) the Ministers' Deputies decided to make their voting procedure more flexible and made a "Gentleman's agreement" not to apply the unanimity rule to recommendations. Recommendations are not binding on member States.

Since 1993 the Committee has also adopted recommendations in accordance with its role in the implementation of the European Social Charter (Article 29 of the Social Charter). Recommendations adopted before 1979 were issued in the "Resolutions" series of texts adopted.

The Statute permits the Committee of Ministers to ask member governments "to inform it of the action taken by them" in regard to recommendations (Article 15.b). In 1987, at their 405th meeting, the Ministers' Deputies adopted a message to the intergovernmental committees (steering committees and committees of experts), urging them to improve their monitoring of the implementation of recommendations and resolutions.

Adopting the budget
Under Article 38.c of the Statute the Secretary General is required to prepare a draft budget each year and submit it to the Committee of Ministers for adoption.
The draft budget is presented to the Deputies in November of each year. It is adopted, along with the Programme of Activities, in the form of resolutions.
Under Article 29 of the Financial Regulations (revised in May 1997) the Deputies are assisted by a Budget Committee composed of eleven independent experts, appointed by the Committee of Ministers acting on proposals from member governments. An abridged version of the adopted budget is available in electronic form.

Communication
In 2006 the Committee of Ministers launched the "Council of Europe Communication Strategy", the first time that the Council of Europe had had a proper communication policy.

Adopting and monitoring the Programme of Activities
Since 1966 the Council of Europe has organised, planned and budgeted its activities according to an annual work programme, published as the "Intergovernmental Programme of Activities". The Deputies adopt the programme towards the end of each year and are entrusted with overseeing its implementation. Article 17 of the Statute authorises the Committee of Ministers to set up "advisory or technical committees". This has led to the creation of some 30 steering committees and a large number of ad hoc expert committees, which assist the Committee of Ministers in the implementation of the programme of activities.

Implementing cooperation and assistance programmes

Supervising the execution of judgments of the European Court of Human Rights
In accordance with Article 46 of the Convention as amended by Protocol No. 11, the Committee of Ministers supervises the execution of judgments of the European Court of Human Rights. This work is carried out mainly at four regular meetings (DH/HR meetings) every year. Documentation for these meetings takes the form of the Annotated Agenda and Order of Business. These documents are made public, as are, in general, the decisions taken in each case. The Committee of Ministers' essential function is to ensure that member states comply with the judgments of the European Court of Human Rights. The Committee completes each case by adopting a final resolution. In some cases, interim resolutions may prove appropriate. Both kinds of Resolutions are public.

Chairmanship 
Incumbent listed in bold.

Notes

References

External links
 Homepage Committee of Ministers

Council of Europe